Le Perthus Pyramid, also referred to as  and locally as Bofill's Pyramid, is a work of landscape architecture designed by Ricardo Bofill Taller de Arquitectura at Le Perthus, France. It is located on the side of the A9 motorway, just north of the France–Spain border at the Col du Perthus, which it was built to mark symbolically. It was designed in 1974 and completed in 1976.

History and description

The Pyramid was commissioned by the highway operator  for their public art program. Ricardo Bofill Taller de Arquitectura's initial concept was of a one-kilometer-long sequence of artificial landscape along the highway, a "longitudinal monument" to mark the transition from Spain to France, punctuated by visually striking shapes including a series of colossal truncated pyramids. The later design process focused on a single artificial pyramid-shaped hill to be built from materials excavated during the construction of the highway.

The pyramid's base is a notional square of 160 meters side length, above which it rises to a height of 70 meters. Ricardo Bofill and his team viewed it as a celebration of the role of the Pyrenean mountain passes, and especially of the Col du Perthus, in Catalan history. To that effect, the four columns at the top evoke the Catalan national emblem or Senyera. The design carries further influences from Mesoamerican architecture, Italian gardens, and surrealism. 

As it was inaugurated in 1976 after the death of Francisco Franco and the start of the Spanish transition to democracy, the pyramid also became a symbol for Spain's European aspirations and opening to its northern neighbors.

See also
 List of works by Ricardo Bofill Taller de Arquitectura
 Monumento a la Raza (Mexico City)
 Labirinto della Masone
 Mesoamerican pyramids

Notes

Buildings and structures in Pyrénées-Orientales
Tourist attractions in Pyrénées-Orientales
Landscape art
France–Spain border
Ricardo Bofill buildings